Alfred Akirov, born in 1941, is an Israeli businessman. He is the founder of the Alrov Group.

Biography
Alfred Akirov was born in Iraq to a Jewish family. He immigrated to Israel with his family in 1953.

Business career
Akirov founded the Alrov Group in 1978 and he is currently its CEO. It has been listed on the Tel Aviv Stock Exchange since 1983. He helped rebuild Mamilla.

Public service
Akirov served as the President of the French-Israeli Chamber of Commerce from 2010 to 2012. He became a Knight of the French Legion of Honour in 2013.

Akirov serves on the Board of Governors of Tel Aviv University.

References

Living people
1941 births
Iraqi emigrants to Israel
Israeli businesspeople
Israeli company founders
Chevaliers of the Légion d'honneur
Tel Aviv University people